Nore Stave Church is a stave church located at Nore in Nore og Uvdal kommune in Viken county, Norway.

Description
Dendrochronological dating of wood samples indicate that Nore stave church was built after 1167. The church was built with galleries, a chancel and cross naves  an architectural style that was unique in Europe during the Middle Ages. This style has come to be known as Nummedals-type. Decorations are from different periods. Nore is decorated with tendril and animal carvings. Animal characters featured include dragons and lions.

The church has a central mast that was originally the support for a tower, mostly likely containing church bells. The walls and ceiling of the interior are decorated with murals, among them scenes from the Bible presented as riddles. The church has been remodeled several times, with many original parts preserved. The church was partly rebuilt in the 1600s and 1700s. The chancel was replaced in 1683, and the spokes of the nave in the first half of the 18th century. The church received a new roof in 1730. Comprehensive repair was carried out in 1927.

In 1888, art historian, professor of art history, and author Lorentz Dietrichson (1834–1917) became the owner of the church. Professor Dietrichson, who played a major role in founding the Society for the Preservation of Ancient Norwegian Monuments (Fortidsminneforeningen), donated the property to the society in 1890.

Gallery

References

Other sources
 Leif Anker (2005) The Norwegian Stave Churches   (Oslo: Arfo Forlag)

External links

 Nore stave church in Fortidsminneforeningen
 Nore stave church, Directorate for Cultural Heritage (in Norwegian)
 Nore stave church in Stavkirke.org (in Norwegian)
 Nore stave church in a video about churches in Numedal

12th-century churches in Norway
Stave churches in Norway
Churches in Viken
Nore og Uvdal
Cruciform churches in Norway
Buildings and structures owned by the Society for the Preservation of Ancient Norwegian Monuments
Churches completed in 1167